Sphaerisporangium rubeum is an actinomycete species of bacteria first isolated from sandy soil. It produces branching substrate mycelia and spherical spore vesicles on aerial hyphae that contain non-motile spores. They also contained diaminopimelic acid and the N-acetyl type of peptidoglycan. Its type strain is 3D-72(35)T (=JCM 13067T =DSM 44936T).

References

Further reading

Cao, Yan-Ru, et al. "Sphaerisporangium flaviroseum sp. nov. and Sphaerisporangium album sp. nov., isolated from forest soil in China."International Journal of Systematic and Evolutionary Microbiology 59.7 (2009): 1679-1684.
Mingma, Ratchanee, et al. "Sphaerisporangium rufum sp. nov., an endophytic actinomycete from roots of Oryza sativa L." International Journal of Systematic and Evolutionary Microbiology 64.Pt 4 (2014): 1077–1082.
Suriyachadkun, Chanwit, et al. "Sphaerisporangium krabiense sp. nov., isolated from soil." International Journal of Systematic and Evolutionary Microbiology61.12 (2011): 2890–2894.

External links
LPSN

Type strain of Sphaerisporangium rubeum at BacDive -  the Bacterial Diversity Metadatabase

Pseudonocardineae
Bacteria described in 2007